Androcalva cuneata is a species of flowering plant in the family Malvaceae and is endemic to the south-west of Western Australia. It is a low, spreading, densely hairy shrub that sometimes forms suckers and has wedge-shaped leaves and clusters of 5 to 15 pink flowers.

Description
The leaves are densely covered with white star-shaped hairs, and the edges are wavy or crumpled with irregular indentations. There is a single hairy, egg-shaped staminode.

Taxonomy
This species was first formally described in 1852 by Nikolai Turczaninow who gave it the name Rulingia cuneata in the journal, Bulletin de la Société impériale des naturalistes de Moscou from specimens collected by James Drummond. In 2011, Carolyn Wilkins and Barbara Whitlock transferred the species to the genus Androcalva in Australian Systematic Botany. The specific epithet means "wedge-shaped", referring to the leaves.

Distribution and habitat
Androcalva cuneata grows in open woodland between Darkan and the Cape Arid National Park in the Avon Wheatbelt, Esperance Plains, Jarrah Forest and Mallee bioregions of south-western Western Australia.

References

Malvales of Australia
Flora of Western Australia
Plants described in 1852
cuneata
Taxa named by Nikolai Turczaninow